The Banking Class were five  Brunel gauge steam locomotives for assisting ("banking") trains up inclines on the Great Western Railway. Designed by Daniel Gooch, they were tank engine versions of his Standard Goods class, and mainly built at Swindon Works.

The last one was withdrawn in 1889.

Locomotives
Avalanche (1846–1865)
Built in February 1846 and ceasing work in August 1865, Avalanche was not part of the Swindon-built Standard Goods locomotive build, but instead it was built by the Stothert and Slaughter and was similar to the Caesar class tender goods engines.
Bithon (1854–1871)
Iago (1852–1881)
Juno (1852–1889)
Juno was sold to the South Devon Railway in June 1872, where it was renamed Stromboli. It returned to the GWR upon absorption of the SDR in 1876, when it was given the number 2138 but retained its Stromboli name. It was the last survivor, being withdrawn in June 1889.
Plato (1854–1883)

References

Banking
0-6-0ST locomotives
Broad gauge (7 feet) railway locomotives
Avonside locomotives
Railway locomotives introduced in 1846
Railway locomotives introduced in 1852
South Devon Railway locomotives
Scrapped locomotives